Conus gigasulcatus is a species of sea snail, a marine gastropod mollusk in the family Conidae, the cone snails and their allies.

Like all species within the genus Conus, these snails are predatory and venomous. They are capable of "stinging" humans, therefore live ones should be handled carefully or not at all.

Description
The size of an adult shell varies between 28 mm and 90 mm.

Distribution
This species occurs in the Pacific Ocean off Fiji and Vanuatu

References

 Tucker J.K. (2009). Recent cone species database. September 4, 2009 Edition.
 Tucker J.K. & Tenorio M.J. (2009) Systematic classification of Recent and fossil conoidean gastropods. Hackenheim: Conchbooks. 296 pp.
 Puillandre N., Duda T.F., Meyer C., Olivera B.M. & Bouchet P. (2015). One, four or 100 genera? A new classification of the cone snails. Journal of Molluscan Studies. 81: 1–23
 Moolenbeek, R., Röckel, D. & Bouchet, P., 2008. New records and new species of cones from deeper water off Fiji (Mollusca, Gastropoda, Conidae). Vita Malacologica 6: 35–49

External links
 The Conus Biodiversity website
 
 Holotype in MNHN, Paris

gigasulcatus
Gastropods described in 2008